Robert H. McMahon is a retired United States Air Force major general who later served as Assistant Secretary of Defense for Sustainment. Prior to assuming his most recent role, McMahon served as president of Fickling Management Services and as a board member of State Bank and Trust, the Mercer National Engineering Advisory Board, and the Robins Air Force Base Museum of Aviation Foundation. He previously served as the director of C-17 Field Operations for the Boeing Company and as president and CEO of the 21st Century Partnership. While on active duty in the Air Force, McMahon's assignments included Commander, Warner Robins Air Logistics Center; Director of Logistics, Headquarters United States Air Force; Director of Logistics, Air Mobility Command; and Commander, 309th Maintenance Wing, Ogden Air Logistics Center.

References

External links
 Biography at the U.S. Air Force

Living people
Year of birth missing (living people)
People from Toledo, Ohio
United States Air Force Academy alumni
Air Force Institute of Technology alumni
United States Air Force generals
Trump administration personnel
United States Assistant Secretaries of Defense